Monks is the plural of monk, a religious ascetic.

Monks may also refer to:

Places:
Monks Bay, Isle of Wight, England
Monks Brook, Hampshire, England
Monks Mound, the largest Pre-Columbian earthwork in America north of Mesoamerica
Monks Wood, Cambridgeshire, England

Other uses:
Monks (surname), a list of people
The Monks, a 1960s rock band
The Monks (UK band), a 1970s punk band
Monks Investment Trust, incorporated in 1929 in Edinburgh, Scotland
Monks (Oliver Twist), a character in Charles Dickens' novel Oliver Twist

See also
Monks Collection, a collection of material relating to South African stamps
Monk (disambiguation)